Lieutenant General Peter John Devlin  was a senior officer in the Canadian Army and is currently President of Fanshawe College.  He served as Commander of the Canadian Army from 2010 to 2013.

Military career
Educated at the University of Western Ontario, Devlin was commissioned into The Royal Canadian Regiment, having joined the Canadian Forces in 1978. Devlin served in an operational role in Cyprus between 1984 and 1985 and in the Former Yugoslavia in 1992, 1996 and 1998. In 1994, following his experiences in the Former Yugoslavia, Devlin published a report which was critical of the fact that the international community "had no International Peacekeeping Training Centre".

He was appointed Commanding Officer of 1st Battalion of The Royal Canadian Regiment in 1997. Then, in 1998, he was the Canadian Battle Group Commanding Officer in Bosnia.

He became Commander of 2 Canadian Mechanized Brigade Group in 2002.

He served with the International Security Assistance Force as Commander of the Kabul Multinational Brigade in Afghanistan from 2003 to 2004.

He was appointed Deputy Commanding General of III (US) Corps and Fort Hood, Texas in 2005 and deployed with the Corps to Iraq. He was Deputy Commanding General of the Multi-National Corps – Iraq from 2006 to 2008  – in that capacity he told the Washington Post that the Multi-National Force was giving "greater legitimacy to the effort here in Iraq.".  In 2008 he was made Deputy Commander of the Canadian Expeditionary Force Command.

In March 2010, it was announced that Devlin would be appointed Chief of the Land Staff within the year. The change of command took place on 21 June 2010.

On 6 February 2013, Devlin announced he would be retiring from the service with Lieutenant-General Marquis Hainse to be his replacement.

Fanshawe College President 
On 8/6/2013, it was announced that Devlin would be the 5th President of Fanshawe College in London, Canada. His appointment was effective as of 9/2/2013.

Honours
100px

22px100px

100px

105px

100px

 He also wore the Canadian Forces Jump Wings With Red Maple Leaf.

References

Year of birth missing (living people)
Living people
Canadian generals
Commanders of the Order of Military Merit (Canada)
Recipients of the Meritorious Service Decoration
University of Western Ontario alumni
Commanders of the Canadian Army
Royal Canadian Regiment officers